Cosmopterix calliochra is a moth of the  family Cosmopterigidae. It is known from Australia.

References

calliochra